"My Man Is a Mean Man" is a song by Swiss recording artist Stefanie Heinzmann, the winner of the TV Total television competition SSDSDSSWEMUGABRTLAD. It was written by Tommy Tysper, Marcus Sepehrmanesh, and Pauline Olofsson, while production was helmed by the former along with Gustav "Grizzly" Jonsson. Heinzmann's recording was picked as her coronation song and debut single. Upon its release, it debuted at number-one on the Swiss Singles Chart and became a top ten hit in Austria and Germany. The song was later included on her debut album, Masterplan (2008).

Charts

Weekly charts

Year-end charts

References

External links
  
 

2008 singles
2008 songs
Stefanie Heinzmann songs
Songs written by Tommy Tysper
Songs written by Marcus Sepehrmanesh
Number-one singles in Switzerland